The Dominican Revolutionary Party (PRD) is a political party in the Dominican Republic. Traditionally a left-of-centre party and social democratic in nature, the party has shifted since the 2000s toward the political centre. The party's distinctive color is white. Traditionally, the party has two presidents: the "Titular President" and the "Acting President" (and actually, a sort of Vice-President); until 2010 the presidents and the Secretary-General were proscribed to run for any elected office.

The party was founded in 1939 by several Dominican expatriated exiles living in Havana, Cuba, led by Juan Bosch. It was then established in the Dominican Republic on 5 July 1961.  It was the first Dominican party based on populist and democratic leftist principles and an organization based on mass membership.  Bosch was elected president in 1962 in what is generally believed to be the first honest election in the country's history. Bosch later left the party in a dispute over its ideological direction, and founded the Dominican Liberation Party on 16 December 1973.

The PRD has won the presidency three other times—in 1978 (Antonio Guzmán), 1982 (Salvador Jorge Blanco) and 2000 (Hipólito Mejía).

At the legislative elections, on 16 May 2002, the party won 41.9% of the popular vote and 73 out of 150 seats in the Chamber of Deputies and 29 out of 31 seats in the Senate of the Dominican Republic. Its candidate at the presidential election on 16 May 2004, Hipólito Mejía, won 33.6% of the votes, failing to win a second term.

In the 16 May 2006 legislative elections, the party formed together with its traditional opponent, the Social Christian Reformist Party, and others the Grand National Alliance, that won 82 out of 178 deputies and 10 out of 32 senators. The Dominican Revolutionary Party led the alliance, however, winning about 60 seats in the chamber of deputies and 6 in the Senate.

The party has been criticized for involvement in corruption, allowing right-wing paramilitary groups to operate from its soil for attacks launched into Haiti, and for becoming an increasingly conservative party serving the interests of transnational capital over the poor majority. The last PRD president, Hipólito Mejía, has been especially criticized for supporting the Iraq War.

Electoral history

Presidential elections

Congressional elections

References 

Sprague, Jeb (2013) La Española, sus coaliciones y la solidaridad entre sus fronteras. In English here: Dominican Republic News
http://www.pambazuka.org/en/category/features/88549 Island of Hispaniola: Coalitions and cross-border solidarity

External links
  

Political parties established in 1939
Political parties in the Dominican Republic
Full member parties of the Socialist International